Hoàng Thị Thùy or  Hoàng Thùy (born 15 March 1992) is a Vietnamese model and beauty pageant titleholder. She began her career in 2011, after winning cycle two of Vietnam's Next Top Model. Eight years later, she was sashed as Miss Universe Vietnam 2019 to represent Vietnam at Miss Universe 2019 and placed in the Top 20. She is often considered one of the most successful Vietnamese models on international runway as well as of Vietnamese 1990s-born model generation.

Background and education
Thùy was born and raised in the commune of Thiền Lâm, Tĩnh Gia District, Thanh Hóa Province of Vietnam to a poor family of four daughters. When she was young, she used to sell rice cakes on coach buses to assist her family. Despite financial struggles, her family continued to support their daughters to continue their education. Thùy graduated from Tĩnh Gia 1 High School in 2010. She was a sophomore majoring in industrial design at Hanoi Architectural University before participating in the second season of Vietnam's Next Top Model and pursuing modelling afterwards. In 2016, she started enrolling in fashion design courses at Central Saint Martins in London.

Career

Vietnam's Next Top Model
In 2011, Thùy joined Vietnam's Next Top Model cycle 2. Throughout the cycle, Thùy performed consistently well and only landed in the bottom two once. In the season finale, Thùy was announced to be the winner over the runners-up Trà My and Lê T. Thúy. In 2015, it was revealed that Tyra Banks, creator of the Top Model franchise and also the special judge of the season 2 finale, fought for Thùy to become the winner of that cycle.

Post show career
She joined Top Model of the World 2012 in Berlin, Germany where she placed in the Top 15 and also won the Best Catwalk Award. Thùy started working both domestically and internationally as soon as she left Vietnam's Next Top Model. She was rejected multiple times by agencies in New York, Paris and London. In February 2014, she went to London to try out for its fashion week's casting calls without having an agency. With no personal contacts, she sent her portfolio by email to all the designers participating in Autumn/Winter 2014 London Fashion Week via any channels she could find. She first heard back from Jean Pierre Braganza and proceeded to successfully book 4 shows that season, which was a turning point in her international career. Since then, she has walked the runways of New York Fashion Week, London Fashion Week and Vietnam International Fashion Week. Thanks to her outstanding achievements, Hoàng Thùy was named in Forbes Vietnam's 30 Under 30 list in early 2015. She signed with PRM Models in London in 2015 and landed a fashion spread on Elle as well as Grazia shortly after, becoming the first Vietnamese model to do so. The same year, Thùy made an appearance on BBC One's The Clothes Show and was the only Asian model in that edition's cast.

In 2017, she became a coach in the second season of The Face Vietnam. Throughout the show, general viewers called Thùy "the master of proverbs" due to her tendency to use Vietnamese proverbs in her confessions.

Miss Universe Vietnam 2017
Shortly after season two of The Face Vietnam ended, it was revealed that Thùy had signed up to join Miss Universe Vietnam 2017. She was a favorite throughout the competition. Ultimately, Thùy was named as the 1st Runner-up and received the People's Choice Award. The top three of the competition were all Vietnam's Next Top Model alumnae with the winner H'Hen Niê participating in cycle 6 (finishing 8th), Thùy winning cycle 2 and Mâu T. Thanh Thủy winning cycle 4. Due to the biennial hosting of Miss Universe Vietnam, the next edition would be held in 2019. Thus, Hoàng Thùy has a chance to represent Vietnam at Miss Universe 2019 if the pageant is held sooner than the country's selection that year.

Miss Universe 2019 
On 6 May 2019, Thùy was officially appointed to be Vietnam's representative at Miss Universe 2019 after she placed 1st runner up in Miss Universe Vietnam 2017. Thùy competed in Miss Universe 2019 and placed in the Top 20 as she was one of the five most outstanding candidates from Africa and Asia Pacific.

Titles, Awards and Nominations

Competitions and Pageants

Awards and nominations

References

1992 births
Living people
Miss Universe 2019 contestants
Next Top Model winners
People from Thanh Hóa province
Vietnamese beauty pageant winners
Vietnamese expatriates in England
Vietnamese female models
21st-century Vietnamese women